The following is an incomplete list of ghost towns in Maryland. Ghost towns can include sites in various states of disrepair and abandonment. Some sites no longer have any trace of civilization and have reverted to pasture land or empty fields. Other sites are unpopulated but still have standing buildings. Some sites may even have a sizable, though small population, but there are far fewer citizens than in its grander historic past.

Many ghost towns can be located in the Appalachian counties, particularly Garrett County. During the 18th and 19th century, a number of "boom towns" were formed to participate in the flourishing coal, railroad, and iron industries. Towards the late 19th century, the resources in the region had begun to deplete, and the onset of the Great Depression finally killed many of the industrial towns.

Classification

Barren site 

 Sites no longer in existence
 Sites that have been destroyed
 Covered with water
 Reverted to pasture
 May have a few difficult to find foundations/footings at most

Neglected site 

 Only rubble left
 All buildings uninhabited
 Roofless building ruins
 Some buildings or houses still standing, but majority are roofless

Abandoned site 

 Building or houses still standing
 Buildings and houses all abandoned
 No population, except caretaker
 Site no longer in existence except for one or two buildings, for example old church, grocery store

Semi abandoned site 

 Building or houses still standing
 Buildings and houses largely abandoned
 few residents
 many abandoned buildings
 Small population

Historic community 

 Building or houses still standing
 Still a busy community
 Smaller than its boom years
 Population has decreased dramatically, to one fifth or less.

List by County

Baltimore City 
Old Town Mall, a largely abandoned commercial district in the center of Baltimore.
 Wagner's Point, an industrial area of Baltimore which had all residents forcibly relocated in the late 1990s for environmental concerns.

Baltimore County 
 Daniels (Partially in Howard County), an old milling town on the Patapsco River.
Relay, formerly a booming railroad town which declined sharply and today contains only a handful of residents and none of its historic landmarks.
 Warren, which was flooded during the creation of Loch Raven Reservoir

Calvert County 
Calverton, the first county seat of Calvert County, which is today a barren site. 
 Wilson, which appeared on maps as late as 1901.

Cecil County 
 Conowingo. The original town was flooded by the creation of Conowingo Reservoir, and the residents relocated to a location nearby.
 Frenchtown, formerly a hub for steam boat travel, which was rendered obsolete by the Chesapeake and Delaware Canal and then later by railroads.
United States Naval Training Center Bainbridge, a naval recruit training center that was operational from 1942 to 1976.

Charles County 
Port Tobacco Village, once the second largest town in Maryland, by 2010 it had declined to the smallest incorporated town in Maryland.

Frederick County 
Harmony Grove, a former milling town which was abandoned in the early 20th century and widely demolished in the 1960s-1970s for a highway expansion. 
 Monocacy. Considered to be the oldest settlement in Western Maryland, the site of Monocacy was lost completely after being abandoned in the early 19th century, and has never been found despite a multitude of historical evidence it existed.

Garrett County 
 Altamont
 Bloomington
 Blooming Rose, first settled in 1791.
 Davis
 Dodson
 Floyd
 Frankville, notable for the 1876 death of Francis Thomas.
 Gleason
 Gorman
 Kempton, a coal town on the border of West Virginia.
 Kendall, an old logging town.
 Schell (partially in Mineral County, West Virginia)
 Selbysport
 Shallmar 
 Skipnish
 Thomas
 Vindex
 Wallman
 Wilson (partially in Grant County, West Virginia)

Harford County 
 Lapidum

Howard County 
 Daniels (Partially in Baltimore County)

Prince George's County 
 Good Luck

Queen Anne's County 
 Broad Creek

Somerset County 
 Marion Station
Tulls Corner, a nearly extinct community near Marion Station.

St. Mary's County 
 St. Mary's City, a former colonial town that has been replaces by a state-run historic area and St. Mary's College of Maryland.

Washington County 
 Fort Ritchie, a former military base which closed in 1998. The last residents were evicted in 2017.
Four Locks, found in the Chesapeake and Ohio Canal National Historical Park. 
Weverton. Although there is a current Weverton, it's not located on the original site.

Worcester County 
 Sinepuxent

See also 

 List of counties in Maryland
 :Category:Mining in Maryland
 Baltimore and Annapolis Railroad

Notes and references

 
Maryland
Ghost towns